The term great diamond may refer to:

 The Great Diamond asterism/constellation

Places
 Great Diamond, Guyana
 Great Diamond Island, Maine

Diamonds
 Great Chrysanthemum Diamond
 Great Mogul Diamond